18th National Board of Review Awards
December 18, 1946
The 18th National Board of Review Awards were announced on 18 December 1946.

Best English-language films
Henry V
Open City
The Best Years of Our Lives
Brief Encounter
A Walk in the Sun
It Happened at the Inn
My Darling Clementine
The Diary of a Chambermaid
The Killers
Anna and the King of Siam

Winners
Best Film: Henry V
Best Actor: Laurence Olivier (Henry V)
Best Actress: Anna Magnani (Open City)
Best Director: William Wyler (The Best Years of Our Lives)

External links
National Board of Review of Motion Pictures :: Awards for 1946

1946
1946 film awards
1946 in American cinema